A revival is a restaging of a stage production after its original run has closed.  New material may be added. A filmed version is said to be an adaptation and requires writing of a screenplay. Revivals are common in Broadway theatre.

References

Stage terminology